The Gerald D. Coorts Memorial Arboretum is an arboretum located on the campus of Tennessee Technological University in Cookeville, Tennessee.

The arboretum was dedicated in 1997 to honor Dr. Gerald Coorts, former dean of Tennessee Tech's College of Agriculture and Home Economics. It currently contains more than 150 trees, shrubs, and flowering
plants, representing approximately 60 species.

See also 
 List of botanical gardens in the United States

External links 
 

Arboreta in Tennessee
Botanical gardens in Tennessee
Protected areas of Putnam County, Tennessee